Humberht (fl. 835-866) was an official (titled duke or prince) among the Tomsaete, who was granted land in Derbyshire in return for what he would provide annually to Christ Church in Canterbury.

External links
 

Anglo-Saxon ealdormen
9th-century English people
Year of birth unknown
Year of death unknown